I40 may refer to:

Hyundai i40 car
Interstate 40 in the United States
 HMS Georgetown (I-40), a Royal Navy ship